Oh Ki-jae (born 26 September 1983) is a South Korean footballer who plays as midfielder for Goyang Hi FC in K League Challenge.

Career
He was selected by FC Seoul in the 2006 K-League draft but didn't made his debut in the capital team.

He joined Ansan Hallelujah in 2007 and moved to Suwon City in 2010. He made a goal in the Suwon Derby against Suwon Samsung on 21 July 2010.

Oh made his professional debut in the opening match of 2013 K League Challenge on 17 March 2013.

References

External links 

1983 births
Living people
Association football midfielders
South Korean footballers
FC Seoul players
Goyang Zaicro FC players
Suwon FC players
K League 1 players
Korea National League players
K League 2 players
Place of birth missing (living people)
Yeungnam University alumni